Oppel is a surname. Notable people with the surname include:

Albert Oppel (1831–1865), German paleontologist
Dorsum Oppel, a wrinkle ridge in Mare Crisium on the Moon
Kenneth Oppel (born 1967), Canadian author
Nicolaus Michael Oppel (1782–1820), German naturalist
Reinhard Oppel (1878–1941), German composer
Richard A. Oppel Jr., an American journalist who reported for The New York Times from Iraq, Israel and Washington, D.C.
Richard Oppel (born 1943), American journalist and was editor of the Austin American-Statesman from 1995 to 2008
Robert Opel, (1939–1979), born Robert Oppel before changing his name to Opel, an American photographer, art gallery owner, and streaker